Thomas Peter  Limberger (born 22 July 1967) is a German industrial manager, restructuring expert, and investor. He is the founder of SilverArrow Capital, an investment company that generated a 24% return in 2014 and a 19% return in 2016.

Early life and education
Limberger holds a Bachelor of Science and Business Administration (B.S.B.A.) from French Grande Ecole Institut supérieur de gestion and Harvard Business School. In 1994, he has 3 children and received a Master of Business Administration in Finance & Strategic Management from State University of New York.

Career

Fresenius Medical Care
In 1996, National Medical Care was acquired, forming Fresenius Medical Care based in Bad Homburg vor der Höhe, Germany. Limberger joined the company in 1996, holding various management roles until 2001.

General Electric
In January 2001, Limberger took a position at General Electric, responsible for the German Industrial business division. In 2002, he became CEO of General Electric Germany, Austria and Switzerland (Central Europe). In this role he was responsible for all General Electric’s activities in Central Europe with 11,000 employees. It was under his management, that the region’s revenues doubled to $6.5 billion and earnings tripled.

He was also at the helm during the integration of Allbank, where he was Chairman until 2005, and the building of a Global GE Research Facility on the Technical University of Munich campus.

OC Oerlikon
In May 2004, Limberger was elected to the board of OC Oerlikon. One year later, after insolvency and a change in key shareholders, he became CEO and Vice President of the board. He centralized management, restructured the 7 industrial business units. He led the company from a loss of 340 million Swiss Francs in 2004 to a record profit of 320 million Swiss Francs in 2006. Due to these efforts and the surge in the Oerlikon share price, the company won the Dow Jones EUROSTOXX 500 prize for the best stock in Europe.

Von Roll
From 2007 until 2011, Limberger was President and CEO of Von Roll, a manufacturer of insulation products and systems for the electrical machinery industry as well as for composite materials and parts for various industrial applications. Limberger successfully turned the company into a market leader in the industry with a sales growth of 33% and an EBIT growth of 103% (CAGR 2006-2008). The share price of the company increased fivefold during this period.

SilverArrow Capital
In 2011, Limberger founded SilverArrow Capital, an investment company focusing on industrial growth sectors, real estate and infrastructure projects. With a deal flow of over $16 billion, Limberger has established himself as one of the leading activist players in the industry. It generated a 24% return in 2014 and a 19% return in 2016. In November 2015, it announced plans to raise its stake in Rofin-Sinar to 15% to force the company to appoint three new independent directors. In March 2016, the company announced that it would be acquired, leading to a surge in the share price.

In October 2016, it acquired 51% of PrivatAir, a Swiss airline. PrivatAir became insolvent in December 2018.

References

External links
 Manager Magazin "Reached the top with 35"
 Brand Eins "Business never has been better"
 Handelszeitung "Thomas Limberger - This India fan is a quick decision maker"
 Die Zeit “I love Germany”

Businesspeople from Hesse
1967 births
Living people
Harvard Business School alumni